Esperanza "Hope" Andrade (born July 1, 1949) is a businesswoman from San Antonio, Texas, who is the former commissioner representing employers on the Texas Workforce Commission, an appointed position which she held from 2013 to 2015. From 2008 to 2012, she was Secretary of State of Texas, an appointed position under Governor Rick Perry.

Texas Workforce Commissioner

An entrepreneur and business and community leader in San Antonio for more than three decades, Andrade was confirmed by the Texas Senate as the workforce commissioner in March 2013. She succeeded Tom Pauken, a fellow Republican who ran unsuccessfully three times for the United States House of Representatives and state attorney general. She held the workforce commission post until June 2015.

Texas Secretary of State
Andrade was appointed secretary of state by Governor Perry in 2008. As secretary of state, she was the state's chief elections officer, chief international protocol officer, and border commerce coordinator for the governor's office.
 
As the elections officer, she toured the state encouraging registration and high voter turnout. She supported the removal of nearly seventy thousand names from the voter rolls of individuals believed to be deceased, based largely on Social Security death records. However, some of the deleted names were of the living, and four individuals sued the state for having been wrongfully stricken from the rolls. Andrade also encountered controversy when  prior to the November 6, 2012 general election she objected to the use of international observers examining Texas voting procedures.

She vacated the secretary of state's office on November 23, 2012, after nearly four-and-a-half years on the job. She was the sixth and longest-serving Texas Secretary of State and the second of three women in the post under Perry. Andrade is the first Hispanic woman to have served as the Texas Secretary of State. However, two Hispanic men, Roy Barrera, Sr., of San Antonio and Henry Cuellar, now a U.S. representative from Laredo, held the position briefly in 1968 and 2001, respectively.

On November 27, 2012, Perry appointed John Thomas Steen, Jr., also of San Antonio, to succeed Andrade as secretary of state. He is an attorney who previously served on the Texas Public Safety Commission and the Texas Alcoholic Beverage Commission. Steen contributed $56,000 to Perry's past gubernatorial campaigns.

Texas Transportation Commissioner
Prior to her appointment as Secretary of State, Andrade was appointed by Governor Perry to the Texas Transportation Commission. She became interim chair of the transportation commission in January 2008, upon the death of its previous chair, Ric Williamson, a former member of the Texas House of Representatives; she left the commission in May 2008. Shortly thereafter, in July of the same year, Perry named her Secretary of State when Samuel P. "Phil" Wilson resigned after one year in the position.

Contract for River Walk barges

On May 25, 2017, Andrade and Lisa Wong, her business partner in their company called Go Rio San Antonio, prevailed in a 10-1 vote from the San Antonio City Council for the $100 million contract to operate the barges on the San Antonio River Walk. The only dissenter on the council was the mayoral candidate Ron Nirenberg, who unseated Mayor Ivy Taylor in a runoff election on June 10. In selecting Andrade and Wong, the council rejected City Manager Sheryl Sculley's recommendation to award the contract instead to the Chicago-based Entertainment Cruises, the choice also of former Mayor Phil Hardberger. On receiving the contract, Andrade told Taylor and the council: "We not only know but we understand why the River Walk is indeed our crown jewel of our beautiful city. And we understand that the barge operation is the thread that weaves it all together."

References

External links

Secretaries of State of Texas
Living people
1949 births
Texas Republicans
Politicians from San Antonio
Businesspeople from Texas
Women in Texas politics
21st-century American politicians
21st-century American women politicians